Left communism is a form of communism with its origins in the left-wing of several parties of the Communist International. Its two main original branches were in council communism and Bordigism. This is a list of theorists and political figures who have identified themselves as left communist, communist left, Bordigist or council communist.

Council communists 
Herman Gorter
Otto Rühle
Jan Appel
Paul Mattick
Guy Debord
Antonie Pannekoek
Bernhard Reichenbach
Henriette Roland Holst
Karl Schröder
Ernst Schwarz

Italian-left communists 
Amadeo Bordiga
Onorato Damen
Jacques Camatte
Suzanne Voute

Left communists 
Inessa Armand
Andrei Bubnov
Marc Chirik
Gilles Dauvé
Guy Debord
Willie Gallacher
Salih Hacioglu
Alexandra Kollontai
Claude McKay
Gavril Myasnikov
Ethem Nejat
Andreu Nin
Sylvia Pankhurst
Mikhail Pokrovsky
Karl Radek
Maximilien Rubel
Grigori Safarov
Natalia Sedova
Alexander Shliapnikov

See also
Left communist organizations by country
List of Left Communist organisations in the Weimar Republic
List of left communist internationals

References

 
Left communists